Hanover Township may refer to the following places in the U.S. state of Michigan:

 Hanover Township, Jackson County, Michigan
 Hanover Township, Wexford County, Michigan

See also 
 Hanover, Michigan, a village in Jackson County

Michigan township disambiguation pages